Bobby Keasler (born September 8, 1945) is a former American football coach. He served as the head football coach at McNeese State University from 1990 to 1998 and at the University of Louisiana at Monroe from 1999 until 2002, compiling a career college football record of 86–62–2.

Head coaching record

College

Notes

References

1945 births
Living people
Louisiana–Monroe Warhawks athletes
Louisiana–Monroe Warhawks football coaches
McNeese Cowboys and Cowgirls athletic directors
McNeese Cowboys football coaches
College men's cross country runners in the United States
College men's track and field athletes in the United States
High school football coaches in Louisiana